Cornelius Neenan (7 August 1894 – 25 July 1979) was an Irish hurler who played for Cork Senior Championship club St Finbarr's. He also had a brief career at senior level with the Cork county team, during which he lined out at midfield.

Honours
St Finbarr's
Cork Senior Hurling Championship (1): 1919

Cork
All-Ireland Junior Hurling Championship (1): 1916
Munster Junior Hurling Championship (1): 1916

References

1894 births
1979 deaths
St Finbarr's hurlers
Lees Gaelic footballers
Cork inter-county hurlers